Confederación Unitaria de Trabajadores (CUT) may refer to:

 Confederación Unitaria de Trabajadores (Costa Rica)
 Confederación Unitaria de Trabajadores del Perú